The 1803 New Hampshire gubernatorial election took place on March 8, 1803. Incumbent Federalist Governor John Taylor Gilman won re-election to a tenth term, defeating Democratic-Republican candidate, former Governor and United States Senator John Langdon in a re-match of the previous year's election.

Results

References 

Gubernatorial
New Hampshire
1803